The Municipality of Šentrupert is a municipality in southeastern Slovenia. The seat of the municipality is the town of Šentrupert. The area is part of the traditional region of Lower Carniola. It is now included in the Southeast Slovenia Statistical Region. 

It was established on 14 June 2006 with the exclusion of the former Local Community Šentrupert (Slovene: Krajevne skupnosti Šentrupert) from the Municipality of Trebnje.

On 15 April 2010, the municipal councilors adopted the coat of arms and the flag proposed by Aleksander Hribovšek. It has historical basis on the coat of arms of Hemma of Gurk which was posthumously, centuries later, fictitiously assigned to her as well as the coat of arms of the Barbo von Waxenstein family. It consists of a golden lion on a blue field holding a silver crescent in its right paw.

Settlements
In addition to the municipal seat of Šentrupert, the municipality also includes the following settlements:

 Bistrica
 Brinje
 Dolenje Jesenice
 Draga pri Šentrupertu
 Gorenje Jesenice
 Hom
 Hrastno
 Kamnje
 Kostanjevica
 Mali Cirnik pri Šentjanžu
 Okrog
 Prelesje
 Ravne nad Šentrupertom
 Rakovnik pri Šentrupertu
 Ravnik
 Roženberk
 Škrljevo
 Slovenska Vas
 Straža
 Trstenik
 Vesela Gora
 Vrh
 Zabukovje
 Zaloka

References

External links

 Municipality of Šentrupert on Geopedia
 Šentrupert municipal site

 
Šentrupert
2006 establishments in Slovenia